Volkovija is a village in the municipality of Mavrovo and Rostuša, North Macedonia.

Demographics
Volkovija (Vukovja) is attested in the Ottoman defter of 1467 as a village in the ziamet of Reka which was under the authority of Karagöz Bey. The village had a total of six households and the anthroponymy recorded depicts an almost exclusively Albanian character: Progon Domi, Pop Radoslav, Kolë Domi, Kolë Domi the other, Andrije Domi, and Muzhava Domi.  

According to the 2002 census, the village had a total of 89 inhabitants. Ethnic groups in the village include:
Albanians 80
Macedonians 9

As of the 2021 census, Volkovija had 21 residents with the following ethnic composition:
Albanians 15
Persons for whom data are taken from administrative sources 6

References

Villages in Mavrovo and Rostuša Municipality
Albanian communities in North Macedonia